Europa is Canadian flutist (flautist) and composer Ron Korb's 16th solo album, recorded in Glenn Gould Studio (Canadian Broadcasting Centre), Canterbury Music, and Kuhl Music, Toronto, Ontario, Canada. The production was accomplished in the end of 2012 and the album's official release in 2013 by Humble Dragon Entertainment. The CD features the artist's inspiration in traveling Europa and visiting birthplaces of classical composers, such as Johann Sebastian Bach, Ludwig van Beethoven, and Wolfgang Amadeus Mozart. The track St. Johann won awards of excellence in composition and awards of merit in acoustic instrument solo performance of Global Music Awards. The album also won best album and best album art/graphic (by Jade Yeh) of Global Music Awards. The track Beckett's Whisper was on the instrumental finalist in International Acoustic Music Awards.

Track listing

Personnel
Ron Korb: producer, composer, western concert flute, bass flute, Irish flute
Liana Berube: violin
Laila Biali: piano
Larry Crowe: drums, percussion
Bill Evans: piano, accordion, harpsichord
Susan Greenway: piano
Ray Hickey Jr.: guitar
George Koller: bass, cello
Anne Louise-Turgeon: piano
Steve Lucas: bass
Joseph Macerollo: accordion
Aidan Mason: guitar, mandolin We Don't Have to Hold Out
Jim McCarty: drums
Donald Quan: piano
Sharlene Wallace: Celtic harp
Winona Zelenka: cello

References

External links
Europa-Ron Korb, the Whole Note
Ron Korb Interview 2013 by DurhamRegion

2013 albums
Ron Korb albums
Instrumental albums